Smardzów  is a village in the administrative district of Gmina Jerzmanowa, within Głogów County, Lower Silesian Voivodeship, in south-western Poland.

According to Jankowski, Smardzów (also Smarzewo) was registered as Szwedowo in 1507 (at the old Duchy of Głogów).

References

Villages in Głogów County